The Bratt-Smiley House is a historic house at University Street and Broadway in Siloam Springs, Arkansas.

Description
It is a -story wood-frame structure, with asymmetrical massing typical of the Queen Anne period.  It has a wraparound porch supported by Tuscan columns, with an angled shingled gable pediment at the corner.  Above the porch on the southern facade is a clipped-gable projection with three sash windows, while on the west there is a projecting bay section beyond the end of the porch.  Built c. 1900, it is a fine local example of transitional Queen Anne/Colonial Revival architecture.

History
The house was listed on the National Register of Historic Places in 1988.

See also
National Register of Historic Places listings in Benton County, Arkansas

References

Houses on the National Register of Historic Places in Arkansas
Queen Anne architecture in Arkansas
Colonial Revival architecture in Arkansas
Houses completed in 1900
Houses in Siloam Springs, Arkansas
National Register of Historic Places in Benton County, Arkansas
Historic district contributing properties in Arkansas